Narodnoye delo was a Russian-language newspaper founded in Geneva, Switzerland, after the congress of the League of Peace and Freedom in 1867 by a group of exiled Russian revolutionaries. The circle involved in the writing of the newspaper wished to promote the First International in Russia, having in common with its founders their support of the Polish insurgents against the tyranny of the Russian Empire. Nikolay Zhukovsky approached Mikhail Bakunin to collaborate on the newspaper. Bakunin prevented Nikolai Utin from participating in the first edition of the newspaper, which was published 1 September 1868 by Elpidin's press in Geneva. Bakunin and Nikolay Zhukovsky wrote two of the four articles published in the first issue, before Nikolai Utin took control of the editorial.

In the first issue, Zhukovsky described the newspaper as materialist, atheist, and in favour of the socioeconomic liberation of the people. Bakunin declared that the goal of the Russian people was "land and freedom", a reference to the ideas of Nikolay Chernyshevsky and of Land and Liberty.

The goal of Narodnoye delo was to demonstrate that though the peasant struggle in Russia took different forms from those described by Marx, it nevertheless promoted the same collectivization of the means of production. Thus, the declaration of intention of the first issue affirmed:

References

Citations

Sources

Further reading 

 

Russian-language newspapers
Socialist newspapers
Newspapers published in Geneva
1868 establishments in Switzerland